Jerauld may refer to:

In places
Jerauld County, South Dakota, U.S.

In surnames
Charlotte Ann Fillebrown Jerauld (1820-1845), American poet, story writer

In first or middle names
Jerauld R. Gentry (1935–2003), American Air Force test pilot
Dutee Jerauld Pearce (1789–1849), American politician
Jerauld Wright (1898–1995), American Naval officer

In other uses
USS Jerauld (APA-174), American naval ship